Sixteen teams are scheduled to compete in the men's football tournament at the 2024 Summer Olympics. In addition to France, the host nation, 15 men's national under-23 teams will qualify from six separate continental confederations.

Table
On 24 February 2022, the FIFA Council approved the slot allocation for the 2024 Summer Olympics. The host nation France, earns automatic qualification to the tournament. For the remaining 15 slots, the AFC and CAF each received 3.5 slots, UEFA received 3 slots, CONCACAF and CONMEBOL received 2 slots, and the OFC received 1 slot.
Dates and venues are those of final tournaments (or final round of qualification tournaments); various qualification stages may precede these matches.

2022 CONCACAF U-20 Championship

The finalists of the 2022 CONCACAF U-20 Championship will earn Olympic qualification places.

Qualified teams

{| class="wikitable sortable"
|-
! 
! Team
! Method ofqualification
! Date ofqualification
! data-sort-type="number"|Appearance
! Lastappearance
! Previous bestperformance
! Olympicappearances
|-
| rowspan="16"|Groupstage ||  || rowspan="16"|Top 16 ranked entrant || rowspan="16"| || 25th || 2018 ||  (2017, 2018) || 14
|-
|  || 27th || 2018 ||  (1962, 1970, 1973, 1974, 1976, 1978, 1980, 1984, 1990, 1992, 2011, 2013, 2015) || 12
|-
|  || 12th || 2018 ||  (2015) || 0
|-
|  || 20th || 2018 ||  (1982, 1994) || 5
|-
|  || 21st || 2018 ||  (1988, 2009) || 3
|-
|  || 18th || 2018 ||  (1964) || 1
|-
|  || 14th || 2018 ||  (1970, 1974) || 2
|-
|  || 10th || 2018 ||  (1978) || 0
|-
|  || 24th || 2018 ||  (1986, 1996) || 3
|-
|  || 21st || 2018 ||  (1990) || 0
|-
|  || 20th || 2018 ||  (1962, 1973) || 3
|-
|  || 21st || 2018 ||  (1970) || 0
|-
|  || 5th || 2018 ||  (1980, 1986, 2017) || 0
|-
|  || 7th || 2018 ||  (1976, 1980, 1986, 1990, 2011, 2018) || 0
|-
|  || 4th || 2018 ||  (2007, 2017, 2018) || 0
|-
|  || 3rd || 2018 ||  (2015, 2018) || 0
|-
| rowspan="4"|Knockoutstage ||  ||  || rowspan="2"| || 9th || 2018 ||  (1974, 1976, 1978, 1980, 1982, 1984, 2013, 2018) || 0
|-
|  ||  || 10th || 2018 ||  (1976) || 0
|-
|  ||  || rowspan="2"| || 14th || 2018 ||   (1962) || 1
|-
|  ||  || 6th || 2018 ||  (1976) || 0
|}NotesGroup stage

Knockout stage

2023 UEFA European Under-21 Championship

The top three teams in the 2023 UEFA European Under-21 Championship (not including Olympic hosts France) will qualify for the Olympics.

Qualified teamsNotes'''

2023 OFC Men's Olympic Qualifying Tournament

Eligible teams

2023 Africa U-23 Cup of Nations

2024 AFC U-23 Asian Cup

2024 CONMEBOL Pre-Olympic Tournament

Qualified teams

AFC–CAF play-off

References

 
Men